Abdullah Saddikah  is a Syrian football defender who played for Syria in the 1988 Asian Cup.

International Record

References

11v11 Profile

Syrian footballers
1971 births
Living people
Association football defenders
1988 AFC Asian Cup players
Syria international footballers